World War Z is a 2013 American action horror film directed by Marc Forster, with a screenplay by Matthew Michael Carnahan, Drew Goddard, and Damon Lindelof, from a  story by Carnahan and J. Michael Straczynski, based on the title of the 2006 novel of the same name by Max Brooks (the son of well-known actors Mel Brooks and Anne Bancroft). It stars Brad Pitt as Gerry Lane, a former United Nations investigator who travels the world seeking a solution for a sudden zombie apocalypse. The ensemble supporting cast includes Mireille Enos, Daniella Kertesz, James Badge Dale, Ludi Boeken, Matthew Fox, Fana Mokoena, David Morse, Elyes Gabel, Peter Capaldi, Pierfrancesco Favino, Ruth Negga, and Moritz Bleibtreu.

Pitt's Plan B Entertainment secured the film rights to Brooks' novel in 2007, and Straczynski was approached to write and Forster was approached to direct. In 2009, Carnahan was hired to rewrite the script. With a planned December 2012 release and a projected budget of $125 million, filming began in July 2011 in Malta, before moving to Glasgow in August and Budapest in October. The production suffered some setbacks, and, in June 2012, the release date was pushed back, and the crew returned to Budapest for seven weeks of additional shooting. Damon Lindelof was hired to rewrite the third act, but did not have time to finish the script, and Drew Goddard was hired to finish the rewrite. The reshoots took place between September and October 2012, ballooning the budget to a reported $190 million, although some publications have listed it as high as $269 million.

The film premiered in London on June 2, 2013, and was chosen to open the 35th Moscow International Film Festival. It premiered in New York and Los Angeles on June 14, and was released elsewhere in the United States on June 21, in 2D and RealD 3D. Reviews were mixed, being praised for Brad Pitt's performance and for the film as a realistic revival of the zombie genre, but criticism of what some felt was an anti-climax, outdated CGI, and a lack of faithfulness to the source material. The film was a commercial success, grossing over $540 million against a production budget of $190 million, making it the highest-grossing zombie film of all time. A sequel was announced shortly after the film's release, but in February 2019 plans for the sequel were cancelled, reportedly due to budget issues.

Plot

Former United Nations investigator Gerry Lane, his wife, Karin, and their two daughters, Rachel and Connie, are in heavy Philadelphia traffic when the city is overrun by zombies; Gerry discovers it takes 12 seconds for an infection to complete. As chaos spreads, the Lanes escape to Newark and take refuge in an apartment with a couple and their young son, Tommy. They are rescued by a helicopter sent by U.N. Deputy Secretary-General Thierry Umutoni, and bring Tommy with them after his parents were both infected due to their refusal to accompany them. The group is brought to a U.S. Navy vessel in the Atlantic Ocean, where scientists and military personnel are analyzing the outbreak. Andrew Fassbach, a virologist, insists the plague is a virus and the development of a vaccine depends on finding its origin, and Gerry, after his family are threatened with eviction from the safety of the vessel, agrees to help Fassbach in his search.

Gerry, Fassbach, and a Navy SEAL escort first fly to Camp Humphreys in South Korea where the first report of zombies occurred. Upon landing they are attacked by zombies causing Fassbach to panic and accidentally kill himself when he trips over and accidentally shoots himself in the head with his own gun. American soldiers at the camp rescue the team, and Gerry learns the infection was introduced to the base by its doctor. Gerry interviews an imprisoned CIA officer at the base who tells him to go to Israel, revealing Israeli Mossad were able to learn about the virus before the outbreak occurred and managed to build a safe zone. Karin attempts to contact Gerry by phone and the group is attacked by zombies attracted by the ringing, while only Gerry and the pilot escape.

In Jerusalem, Gerry meets Jurgen Warmbrunn, a high-ranking official in Mossad, who explains that they have intercepted the communications from armies of Indian troops fighting against the "rakshasa" (Zombies). With their knowledge, the country managed to quarantine itself by building a large wall, and allows a large number of refugees to enter the city. While Warmbrunn shows Gerry around, a loud celebratory singing from the refugees attracts zombies from the outside of the city and they breach the wall. As the city is quickly overrun, Warmbrunn orders Israeli soldiers to escort Gerry back to his plane, being provided air support from an Israeli Defence Force helicopter. On the way, Gerry notices zombies ignoring an old man and an emaciated boy. When one of the escorts, identifying herself only as "Segen", is bitten on the hand, Gerry quickly amputates the appendage, preventing further infection, and the pair are able to make it out of the city aboard a commercial airliner.

Musing on what he saw in Jerusalem, Gerry calls Thierry, and has him divert the plane to a World Health Organization medical research facility in Cardiff. On approach, a stowaway zombie is discovered, and the majority of passengers and the flight attendants are quickly infected. Gerry sets off a grenade to rupture the cabin and eject the zombies, but it also results in a crash landing.

Gerry and Segen survive the crash and make their way to the Cardiff facility where he faints from his injuries. Three days later, Gerry awakens and explains a theory – that the zombies ignore terminally ill or severely injured people as they are unsuitable hosts for the infection – to WHO employees. He suggests injecting themselves with a deadly pathogen to act as a "camouflage" against the zombies. However, the scientists point out their pathogens are located in a zombie infested portion of the facility. Gerry, Segen, and the head doctor battle their way through the lab, where Gerry finds himself in the room with the pathogen samples. Before he can leave, a lone zombie appears behind the door and blocks Gerry’s only means of escape; forcing him to inject himself with one of the pathogens to test his theory.  When Gerry opens the door, his theory is proven correct; the zombie ignores him, allowing him to walk with the pathogen samples and safely bypass the rest of the zombies in the lab.

Gerry and Segen arrive at a safe zone in Freeport, Nova Scotia, where he is reunited with his family and Tommy. A vaccine is then developed which acts as a camouflage against the zombies, allowing survivors to safely escape zombie-infested areas, and even mount offensives against them, but the war goes on.

Cast

 Brad Pitt as Gerry Lane, a former United Nations investigator who agrees to investigate the zombie pandemic to protect his wife and children
 Mireille Enos as Karin Lane, Gerry's wife and Rachel and Connie's mother
 Daniella Kertesz as Segen, a soldier in the Israel Defense Forces who accompanies Gerry after Jerusalem falls ("Segen" is an IDF rank equivalent to a Lieutenant)
 James Badge Dale as Captain Speke, a U.S. Army Ranger stationed at Camp Humphreys in South Korea
 Ludi Boeken as Jurgen Warmbrunn, a high-ranking official in the Mossad
 Matthew Fox as Parajumper, who is sent to extract the Lane family from Newark and bring them to the U.N. vessel
 Fana Mokoena as Thierry Umutoni, the Deputy Secretary-General of the United Nations, who used to be Gerry's boss and enlists Gerry to investigate the pandemic
 David Morse as Ex-CIA officer, who was imprisoned in South Korea for assisting North Korea's fight against the zombies
 Elyes Gabel as Andrew Fassbach, a young Harvard virologist who goes to South Korea with Gerry
 Peter Capaldi as W.H.O. Doctor (in Wales)
 Pierfrancesco Favino as W.H.O. Doctor (in Wales)
 Ruth Negga as W.H.O. Doctor (in Wales)
 Moritz Bleibtreu as W.H.O. Doctor (in Wales)
 Sterling Jerins as Constance "Connie" Lane, Gerry and Karin's youngest daughter and Rachel's younger sister
 Abigail Hargrove as Rachel Lane, Gerry and Karin's oldest daughter and Connie's older sister
 Fabrizio Zacharee Guido as Tomas, an orphaned Hispanic boy who is taken in by the Lane family after his parents were both infected
 David Andrews as Naval Commander Mullenaro, who is in charge of the U.N. vessel to which the Lane family is brought
 John Gordon Sinclair as a Navy SEAL Chief, who goes to South Korea with Gerry
 Grégory Fitoussi as C130 Pilot, who flies Gerry from South Korea to Israel
 Michiel Huisman as Ellis, a U.S. Army Ranger in Speke's unit
 Nikola Đuričko as Captain of "Belarus Airlines"

Production

Development

After a bidding war with Leonardo DiCaprio's production company Appian Way, Brad Pitt's Plan B Entertainment secured the screen rights to Max Brooks' novel in 2007. The first screenplay was written by Babylon 5 and Rising Stars creator J. Michael Straczynski, who identified the challenge in adapting the work as "creating a main character out of a book that reads as a UN report on the zombie wars." Marc Forster signed on to direct, and described the film as reminiscent of 1970s conspiracy thrillers like All the President's Men. Straczynski identified 2002 spy film The Bourne Identity as an appropriate comparison, and noted that the film would have a large international scope that maintained the political emphasis. When asked about his involvement with the film, author Max Brooks stated he had "zero control", but favored a role for Brad Pitt, and expressed approval for Straczynski as screenwriter. Brooks said: "I can't give it away, but Straczynski found a way to tie it all together. The last draft I read was amazing."

An early script was leaked onto the internet in March 2008, leading to a review by Ain't It Cool News that called it "[not] just a good adaptation of a difficult book [but] a genre-defining piece of work that could well see us all arguing about whether or not a zombie movie qualifies as 'Best Picture' material". The script was well-enough respected to find a place on the 2007 Black List of "most liked" screenplays not yet produced. The Ain't It Cool News review also noted the film appears stylistically similar to Children of Men, following Gerry Lane as he travels the post-war world and interviews survivors of the zombie war who are "starting to wonder if survival is a victory of any kind."

In December 2008, Straczynski said he hoped the film would begin production by the start of 2009, but, in March 2009, Forster said the script was still in development and he was not sure if World War Z would be his next film. Later in March, rumors surfaced that production offices were set up and the film was in early pre-production. Then, in June, Forster told an interviewer that the film would be delayed, stating that its script still needed a lot of development and was "still far from realization".

Brooks revealed that the script was being re-written by Matthew Michael Carnahan in July 2009. He said he believed this "show[ed] [the producer's] confidence in this project" because of the amount of money that was being invested in it. Paramount Pictures and UTV Motion Pictures announced at the 2010 Comic-Con that Forster was set as director, and Brad Pitt was confirmed to be playing the lead role. In March 2011, it was reported on Vulture that Paramount was searching for a co-financier, and would likely pull the plug on the adaptation without one. The article also stated that "an eleventh-hour effort is being made to court frequent Paramount co-financier David Ellison." A week later, it was reported that "hot and heavy talks are going on with David Ellison's Skydance and as many as two other financiers."

Pre-production
Pre-production began in April 2011, with Robert Richardson announced as the cinematographer and Nigel Phelps as production designer. In the same month, it was reported that filming locations would include Pinewood Studios and London, England. Also in April, Mireille Enos was cast as Gerry Lane's wife and mother of their two children.

In June, James Badge Dale entered negotiations to join the film as an American soldier who tries to alert authorities that the zombie threat is real. Matthew Fox and Ed Harris entered talks, and Julia Levy-Boeken was set to join the film. It was reported that filming would begin in Malta the next month and would encompass Valletta and The Three Cities. A few days later, it was reported that filming would also take place in Glasgow, Scotland, in August, the city doubling for Philadelphia, "with false shop fronts being constructed and American cars on the roads." Glasgow was reportedly chosen after "many months looking for the perfect city centre location to play an important part in the film." Philadelphia was passed on due to "uncertainties about state tax credits for filmmakers." Filming was originally planned to take place in Royal Tunbridge Wells, England before moving to Glasgow.

Later in June, visual effects house Cinesite announced that it would work on "a significant amount of shots". At the end of the month, it was reported that, despite previous reports, neither Fox nor Harris would be starring in the film; Fox had a scheduling conflict stemming from his prior commitment to star in Alex Cross with Tyler Perry at Summit Entertainment, though he was later spotted filming scenes for World War Z in Falmouth, Cornwall.

Filming

With a reported budget of over $125 million, World War Z began principal photography in July 2011 in Malta, with the first images of production being released a few days later. Filming was scheduled to move to Glasgow in August, with the production company looking to recruit 2,000 local extras for the shoot. At least 3,000 people showed up at a casting call in Glasgow on July 9, hoping for the opportunity to appear in a scene set in a financial district in Philadelphia. Scenes were also shot in Falmouth, Cornwall. Also in July, Game of Thrones actor Elyes Gabel was cast as a character named Fassbach. Despite opposition from residents, some scenes were shot on the Heygate Estate in South London.

In August, Bryan Cranston entered negotiations to join the film in a "small but flashy" role, but he ultimately had to drop out due to scheduling conflicts. Also in August, filming was set to take place along a road on the perimeter of the Grangemouth Refinery in Grangemouth, Scotland, the location chosen for the length of the road, which was crucial to the shot. A few days later, Paramount announced the film would be released on December 21, 2012. Later in the same month, filming began in Glasgow. The location manager for the film said Glasgow had been chosen because of its architecture, wide roads, and grid layout. Scenes were also filmed aboard the Royal Fleet Auxiliary ship RFA Argus, before the Glasgow shoot. The ship was turned into the "USS Madison", which involved stenciling a new pennant number on the funnel and adding some "Americanism" to the superstructure. Steven McMenemy, the Arguss navigator said: "The ship sailed and we were joined by four small catamarans which were being used as markers for the cameras, so that warships could be added in with CGI later." In October, David Morse was cast as a "prisoner living in an abandoned jail."

The filmmakers initially intended to film a climactic battle scene set in Russia, and the crew moved to Budapest to film it there. Filming in Budapest commenced on the evening of October 10. That morning, the Hungarian Counter Terrorism Centre raided the warehouse where guns had been delivered for use as filming props. The 85 assault rifles, sniper rifles, and handguns had been flown into Budapest overnight on a private aircraft, but the film's producers had failed to clear the delivery with Hungarian authorities, and, while the import documentation indicated the weapons had been disabled, all were found to be fully functional. On February 10, 2012, the charges were dropped after investigators were unable to identify exactly which "organization or person" had "ownership rights"; therefore they could not "establish which party was criminally liable".

Principal photography wrapped on November 4, 2011.

Post-production
In June 2012, screenwriter Damon Lindelof was hired to rewrite the film's third act, with reshoots scheduled to begin that September or October. He was brought in as a new set of eyes not burdened by all the history of the script and said: "[Brad Pitt] took me through how excited he was when he read the book, what was exciting for him, the geopolitical aspect of it. But when we started working on the script, a lot of that stuff had to fall away for the story to come together." Lindelof explained that there were inefficiencies in the script in relation to the shooting that started before the script was finalized, making the ending "abrupt and incoherent", and that the film was missing a large chunk of footage. He presented two options to executives, who ultimately chose to shoot 30 to 40 minutes of additional footage to change the ending. However, Lindelof, who also reworked Prometheus and co-wrote Star Trek Into Darkness, did not have time to script the new ending, so in July Paramount hired his Lost partner Drew Goddard to finish the work. Goddard later told Creative Screenwriting: "To me the big lesson of World War Z was that Paramount, Plan B and Brad Pitt simply said, 'Let's take the time to make this movie the best version of the movie before we put it on the screen for audience.' That doesn't happen a lot. A lot of times they just throw the movie out there and say, 'We'll make all our money opening weekend and then the movie will go away.' I came away from it thinking, 'Why don't we do this on more movies?'"

The re-shoots, coupled with other overages, caused the film's budget to balloon to around $190 million, which shocked Paramount president Marc Evans. Several of the scenes shot in Budapest, including a large-scale battle with the zombies in Moscow's Red Square, were dropped from the final cut in order to water down the film's political undertones and steer it towards a more generally friendly summer blockbuster. The climactic battle scene in Russia, for which there was 12 minutes of footage, reportedly had Pitt's character fighting through zombies more like "a warrior hero" than "the sympathetic family man" of the earlier acts. The second-unit director, Simon Crane, said: "It wasn't character-driven anymore... [The filmmakers] really needed to think about what they wanted to do with the third act." Additional scenes were also filmed at the Pfizer building at Discovery Park in Sandwich, Kent, for scenes where Gerry tries to find a cure for the zombie pandemic.

In March 2013, it was reported that Paramount changed a scene in the film, in which the characters speculate that the zombie outbreak originated in mainland China, in hopes of landing a distribution deal in the country. An executive familiar with upcoming releases in China told TheWrap in June that a cut of the film was rejected by Chinese censors. A Paramount executive contended that he was "unaware of any rejection", explaining: "We have submitted one version and have yet to receive a response."

Music
In December 2011, it was reported that Marco Beltrami had signed on to score World War Z. In May 2013, the British rock band Muse posted a video on their YouTube channel that hinted they would be contributing to the soundtrack of the film; the song "The 2nd Law: Isolated System" from their 2012 album The 2nd Law and the instrumental version of "Follow Me" produced by the electronic band Nero were used. On June 18, 2013, Warner Bros. Records released the soundtrack album for the film, which featured the original score composed by Beltrami.

Release

World War Z was initially scheduled for release by Paramount and Skydance on December 21, 2012, but in March 2012 it was pushed back to June 21, 2013, with Paramount electing to release Jack Reacher on the December 2012 date. Its world premiere was held at the Empire Cinema in Leicester Square, London, on June 2, 2013. On June 6, Brad Pitt attended screenings of the film in Atlanta, Philadelphia, Chicago, and Austin, all in the same day. The film was released at Glasgow's Grosvenor Cinema in Ashton Lane on June 19, two days before it was launched worldwide, and opened the 35th Moscow International Film Festival the next day. In all, Paramount spent $160 million marketing the film worldwide.

Reception

Box office
The film grossed $202.4 million in North America and $337.6 million in other territories, for a worldwide total of $540 million. Variety called it a "bona-fide box office hit", although Deadline Hollywood later said it "barely broke even".

In North America, the film earned $25.2 million on its opening day, including $3.6 million from Thursday night and midnight shows. It went on to earn $66.4 million its opening weekend, finishing second to Monsters University at the box office. This was, at the time, the second-largest opening weekend for a film that did not debut in first place (behind The Day After Tomorrow (2004) with $85,807,341), the largest opening weekend for a film starring Brad Pitt, and the sixth-largest opening among films released in June.

In other territories, the film earned $5.7 million on its opening day (Thursday, June 20, 2013) and $45.8 million its opening weekend, ranking in third place.

Critical response
On Metacritic, it has a weighted average score of 63 out of 100, based on 46 critics, indicating "generally favorable reviews". Audiences surveyed by CinemaScore gave the film a grade of "B+" on an A+ to F scale.

Richard Roeper of the Chicago Sun-Times gave the film a 3.5 out of 4, saying: "It's entertaining as hell" and provides "nearly non-stop action". Peter Travers of Rolling Stone gave the film a 3 out of 4, saying that "the suspense is killer". Henry Barnes of The Guardian considered the film an "attempt at large-scale seriousness" in the zombie genre that resulted in a "punchy, if conventional action thriller." Writing for Variety, Scott Foundas found the film a "surprisingly smart, gripping and imaginative addition to the zombie-movie canon", which shows "few visible signs of the massive rewrites, reshoots and other post-production patchwork." Todd McCarthy of The Hollywood Reporter opined that "Brad Pitt delivers a capable performance in an immersive apocalyptic spectacle about a global zombie uprising." A. O. Scott of The New York Times said, "[It] does not try to extend the boundaries of commercial entertainment but does what it can to find interesting ways to pass the time within them." Kenneth Turan of the Los Angeles Times remarked that "World War Z plays a bit like a series of separate films and the juncture where the new final act was grafted onto the proceedings is unmistakable, but unless you knew about the film's troubled past, you'd never guess it existed."

In a negative review, Joe Neumaier of the New York Daily News said that World War Z "is no summer thriller. It's an anemic actioner that fosters excitement like dead limbs as it lumbers toward a conclusion." Robbie Collin of The Daily Telegraph thought the film had been affected by its troubled development, observing that "the final product has an elaborate uselessness about it", and the film has "no heart to be found amid the guts." Alonso Duralde of TheWrap said: "For all its effectiveness at portraying the horror of possible human extinction, the film's actual humans are so soulless that this could just as well be the movie version of the video game Plants vs. Zombies."

Accolades

Home media
The film was released on Blu-ray and DVD on September 24, 2013. The Blu-ray release includes an unrated alternate cut of the film that features seven minutes of additional footage, most of which consists of additional moments of violence and suspense in the action scenes.

Video games
A video game tie-in survival horror game, World War Z, was developed by Phosphor Games Studio and released for the iOS mobile platforms in May 2013. The game is a spin-off of the film, featuring an entirely different set of characters, and is set in New York, Tokyo, Moscow, Israel, and Paris.

In April 2019, Saber Interactive released a four-player video game, also titled World War Z, for PlayStation 4, Windows PC, and Xbox One, which includes missions set around the world.

Cancelled sequel
According to a report in the Los Angeles Times in January 2012, at that time Marc Forster and Paramount Pictures both viewed "World War Z as a trilogy that would have the grounded, gun-metal realism of, say, Damon's Jason Bourne series tethered to the unsettling end-times vibe of AMC's The Walking Dead." Plans for future installments were shelved for a time due to the film's production troubles, but in June 2013, after the successful opening of the film, Paramount announced it was moving ahead with a sequel. In December, it was reported that J. A. Bayona had been chosen to direct the film, and in May 2014 Steven Knight was set to write the script. In May 2015, it was announced the sequel would be released on June 9, 2017, but in January 2016 Paramount announced director Bayona had left the project due to other commitments.

Variety reported in August 2016 that the sequel was not yet in production, but David Fincher had entered negotiations to be the director, and in April 2017 it was reported Fincher was close to a deal to sign on. On February 8, 2017, Paramount announced the sequel had still not started filming and would not be released until 2018, or possibly even 2019.

Fincher was confirmed by Paramount as the director of the sequel in June 2017, with Brad Pitt to play again the role of Gerry Lane. Filming was slated to start in fall of 2018, though this later changed due to Fincher's involvement in the television series Mindhunter. In October 2018, producer Dede Gardner confirmed the sequel would begin filming in June 2019, and there were several months of pre-production and staffing for principal photography in five countries, but, in February 2019, the film was cancelled. A source quoted by The Hollywood Reporter said the Chinese government's ban on films featuring zombies or ghosts was the single biggest reason that Paramount canceled the sequel.

Notes

References

External links

 
 
 
 
 

2013 3D films
2013 action thriller films
2013 films
2013 horror films
American action horror films
2010s monster movies
American 3D films
American action thriller films
American zombie films
American monster movies
Apocalyptic films
Films about the Israel Defense Forces
Films about viral outbreaks
Films based on American horror novels
Films directed by Marc Forster
Films produced by Brad Pitt
Films scored by Marco Beltrami
Films set in Gyeonggi Province
Films set in Jerusalem
Films set in New York City
Films set in New Jersey
Films set in Nova Scotia
Films set in Philadelphia
Films set in the Atlantic Ocean
Films set in Wales
Films shot in London
Films shot in Malta
Films shot in Glasgow
Films shot in Hungary
Films shot in South Korea
IMAX films
GK Films films
Skydance Media films
Paramount Pictures films
Plan B Entertainment films
Films with screenplays by Damon Lindelof
Films with screenplays by Drew Goddard
Films with screenplays by Matthew Michael Carnahan
Techno-thriller films
World War Z (franchise)
Films about orphans
Films produced by Ian Bryce
2010s English-language films
2010s American films